Hogs Back or Hogsback may refer to:

 The Hog's Back, a hilly ridge in Surrey, England
 Hogs Back Brewery, a brewery in Surrey, England (named after the ridge)
 Hog's Back Falls, a series of artificial falls on the Rideau River, Ottawa, Canada
 Hog's Back Road, a road in Ottawa, Canada
 Hogsback, Eastern Cape, a village in South Africa
 Hogsback Frog, a species of frog endemic to  South Africa
 The Hogs Back, a ridge in the Adirondack Mountains in New York, US
 Hogback Mountain (Klamath County, Oregon) or Hogsback Mountain, Oregon, US
 Hogsback, a snow ridge on the Coalman Glacier, Mount Hood, Oregon, US

See also
 Hogback (disambiguation)